The 2002 British Academy Television Awards were held on Sunday 21 April 2002. The ceremony was hosted by the television presenter Chris Tarrant and broadcast on ITV the following day.

Winners
Best Actor
Winner: Michael Gambon – Perfect Strangers (BBC Two)
Other nominees: Alan Bates – Love in a Cold Climate (BBC One); Timothy Spall – Vacuuming Completely Nude in Paradise (BBC Two); David Suchet – The Way We Live Now (BBC One)
Best Actress
Winner: Julie Walters – My Beautiful Son (ITV)
Other nominees: Lindsay Duncan – Perfect Strangers (BBC Two); Sheila Hancock – The Russian Bride (ITV); Lesley Sharp – Bob & Rose (ITV)
Best Comedy (Programme or Series)
Winner: The Sketch Show (Avalon Television / Baby Cow Productions / ITV)
Other nominees: BrassEye Special (TalkBack Productions / Channel 4); Bremner, Bird and Fortune (Vera Productions / Channel 4); The Kumars at No. 42 (Hat Trick Productions / BBC Two)
Best Comedy Performance
Winner: Ricky Gervais – The Office (BBC Two)
Other nominees: Kathy Burke – Gimme Gimme Gimme (BBC Two); Robert Lindsay – My Family (BBC One); Joanna Lumley – Absolutely Fabulous (BBC One)
Best Drama Serial
Winner: The Way We Live Now (BBC / WGBH / Deep Indigo / BBC One)
Other nominees: Bob and Rose (Red Production Company / ITV); Perfect Strangers (TalkBack Productions / BBC Two); The Russian Bride (Monogram Productions / ITV)
Best Drama Series
Winner: Cold Feet (Granada Television / ITV)
Other nominees: At Home with the Braithwaites (Yorkshire Television / ITV); Clocking Off (Red Production Company / BBC One); Tales from Pleasure Beach (Blast Film Productions / BBC Two)
Best Single Drama
Winner: When I Was 12 (BBC / BBC Two)
Other nominees: My Beautiful Son (Granada Television / ITV); The Navigators (Parallex Films / Channel 4); Othello (London Weekend Television / ITV)
Best Soap Opera
Winner: EastEnders (BBC / BBC One)
Other nominees: Coronation Street (Granada Television / ITV); Doctors (BBC / BBC One); Hollyoaks (Mersey Television / Channel 4)
Best Current Affairs
Winner: Dispatches: Beneath the Veil (Hardcash Productions / Channel 4)
Other nominees: Endgame in Ireland (Brook Lapping / BBC Two); Panorama - Jeffrey Archer: A Life of Lies (BBC / BBC One); One Day of Terror – New York Witnesses (BBC / BBC Two)
Best Entertainment Performance
Winner: Graham Norton – So Graham Norton (Channel 4)
Other nominees: Ant and Dec – Pop Idol (ITV); John Bird and John Fortune – Bremner, Bird and Fortune (Channel 4); Paul Merton – Have I Got News For You (Hat Trick Productions / BBC One)
Best Factual Series or Strand
Winner: Horizon (BBC / BBC Two)
Other nominees: The Blue Planet (BBC / BBC One); Langan Behind the Lines (BBC / BBC Two); Welcome to Britain (BBC / BBC One)
Best Feature
Winner: Faking It (RDF Media / Channel 4)
Other nominees: Farmer Wants a Wife (Thames Television / ITV); The Sound of Music Children: After They Were Famous (Tyne Tees Television / ITV); What Not to Wear (BBC / BBC Two)
Flaherty Award for Single Documentary
Winner: Kelly and Her Sisters (Carlton Television / ITV)
Other nominees: True Stories – Battlecentre (Diverse Productions / Channel 4); Ellen MacArthur – Sailing Through Heaven and Hell (BBC Wales / BBC One); When Louis Met The Hamiltons (BBC / BBC One)
Huw Wheldon Award for Specialist Factual
Winner: Arena – The Private Dirk Bogarde (Various / BBC Two)
Other nominees: The 1940s House (Wall to Wall / Channel 4); The Six Wives of Henry VIII (Granada Television / Channel 4); Walk On By: The Story of Popular Song (BBC / BBC Two)
Best Entertainment Programme or Series
Winner: Pop Idol (Thames Television / 19 TV / ITV)
Other nominees: Have I Got News For You (Hat Trick Productions / BBC One); Parkinson (BBC / BBC One); Room 101 (Hat Trick Productions / BBC Two)
News Coverage
Winner: September 11 – 12 (Sky News / Sky News)
Other nominees: Attack on America – 11 September (ITN / Channel 4); Attack on America – 11 September (ITN / ITV); The BBC News Coverage of the Fall of Kabul – 12 November – 13 November (BBC News / BBC One / BBC Two / BBC News 24)
Situation Comedy Award
Winner: The Office (BBC / BBC One)
Other nominees: Gimme Gimme Gimme (Tiger Aspect Productions / Hartswood Films / BBC Two); Happiness (BBC / BBC Two); Spaced II (London Weekend Television / Channel 4)
Sport
Winner: Channel 4 Cricket (Sunset + Vine / Channel 4)
Other nominees: British Grand Prix, Silverstone 2001 – Farewell to Murray Walker (Chrysalis Sport / Granada Sport / ITV); FA Cup Final 2001 – Liverpool vs Arsenal (ISN / Carlton Television / ITV); Germany vs England (BBC / BBC One)
Innovation Award
Winner: Doubletake (Tiger Aspect Productions / BBC Two)
Other nominees: Banzai (RDF Media / E4 / Channel 4); The Blue Planet – The Deep (BBC / BBC One); BrassEye Special (TalkBack Productions / Channel 4)
Special Award
BBC Natural History Unit
The Alan Clarke Award
Verity Lambert
The Dennis Potter Award
Stephen Poliakoff
Academy Fellowship
Andrew Davies
Special Award for Contribution to Television
Murray Walker

References
Archive of winners on official BAFTA website (retrieved February 4, 2006).
British Academy Television Awards 2002  at the Internet Movie Database.

Television2002
2002 awards in the United Kingdom
2002 television awards
2002 in British television
April 2002 events in the United Kingdom